Georai Assembly constituency is one of the 288 Vidhan Sabha (legislative assembly) constituencies of Maharashtra state in western India.

Overview
Georai (constituency number 228) is one of the six Vidhan Sabha constituencies located in the Beed district. It covers the entire Georai tehsil and parts of Majalgaon and Beed tehsils of this district.

Georai is part of the Beed Lok Sabha constituency along with all other Vidhan Sabha segments in this district, namely Parli, Majalgaon, Beed, Ashti and Kaij.

Members of Legislative Assembly
 1972: Sundarrao Solanke, Unopposed MLA
 1978: Shivajirao Ankushrao pandit, Indian National Congress
 1981: Shivajirao Ankushrao pandit, Indian National Congress
 1985: Shivajirao Ankushrao pandit, Indian National Congress
 1990: Shivajirao Ankushrao pandit, Indian National Congress
 1995: Badamrao Pandit, Independent
 1999: Badamrao Pandit, Independent
 2004: Amarsinh Pandit, Bharatiya Janata Party
 2009: Badamrao Pandit, Nationalist Congress Party
 2014: Laxman Pawar, Bharatiya Janata Party
 2019: Laxman Pawar, Bharatiya Janata Party

See also
 Gevrai
 List of constituencies of Maharashtra Vidhan Sabha

References

Assembly constituencies of Maharashtra